Stranger Hollow (also known as Stranger's Hollow) is a tributary of Catawissa Creek in Columbia County, Pennsylvania, in the United States. The stream is considered to be a coldwater fishery. The main rock formations in the stream's watershed are the Mauch Chunk Formation and the Pocono Formation and the main soils are the Leck Kill soil and the Hazleton soil. Historically the Catawissa Railroad and the Philadelphia and Reading Railway crossed over the stream.

Course
Stranger Hollow begins on Catawissa Mountain in Beaver Township. It flows east for a few tenths of a mile and enters a valley. It eventually turns northeast for another few tenths of a mile before reaching its confluence with Catawissa Creek.

Tributaries
Stranger Hollow has no tributaries, named or unnamed.

Hydrology
Stranger Hollow is considered to be impaired by atmospheric deposition due to pH. The pH of the stream is unknown.

Geography and geology

The lower reaches of Stranger Hollow are on rock of the Mauch Chunk Formation. The rest of the stream is on rock of the Pocono Formation. The lower reaches of the stream are on Leck Kill soil and the rest of the stream is on Hazleton soil.

Watershed and history
Most of the watershed is in Beaver Township, but a small portion on its western side is in Roaring Creek Township. The headwaters of the stream are in Pennsylvania State Game Lands Number 58, as is most of the rest of the watershed. The watershed is almost entirely on forested land. It is in the Shumans United States Geological Survey quadrant.

It is difficult to access Stranger Hollow and no portion of the stream is within  of a road.

The population density of the watershed of Stranger Hollow was 10 people per square kilometer in 1990.

In the late 1800s, a railroad bridge carrying the Philadelphia and Reading Railway crossed Stranger Hollow. An 1862 article described the view from the Catawissa Railroad near the stream as a "most striking and characteristic view".

Biology
Stranger Hollow is considered by the Pennsylvania Department of Environmental Protection to be a coldwater fishery.

See also
Long Hollow (Catawissa Creek), next tributary of Catawissa Creek going downstream
Klingermans Run, next tributary of Catawissa Creek going upstream
List of tributaries of Catawissa Creek

References

External links
Map of the watershed of Catawissa Creek

Rivers of Columbia County, Pennsylvania
Tributaries of Catawissa Creek
Rivers of Pennsylvania